The Flemish Guard was a collaborationist paramilitary formation which served as an auxiliary police in parts of German-occupied Belgium during World War II. Both associated with the pre-war Flemish Movement, the VNV soon emerged as the largest collaborationist faction in Flanders during the occupation. In propaganda, the Flemish Guard was depicted as the police force of a future independent Flanders. It was distinct from the Flemish Legion, formed by the VNV in July 1941, to participate in the German invasion of the Soviet Union. 

The Flemish Guard was finally brought under exclusive German control in July 1944 following the Allied landings in Normandy. By the time of the Liberation of Belgium in September 1944, the Flemish Guard was withdrawn into Germany and its remaining personnel were brought in to increase the strength of the newly created 27th SS Volunteer Grenadier Division Langemarck.

See also
Walloon Guard, a similar organisation established in November 1941 under direct German control.

References

Bibliography

1941 establishments in Belgium
1944 disestablishments in Belgium
Auxiliary police units of Nazi Germany
Belgian collaboration during World War II
Military units and formations established in 1941
Military units and formations disestablished in 1944
Flemish Movement
Foreign units of Nazi Germany